Mike Santiago may refer to:
 Mike Santiago (American football)
 Mike Santiago (fighter)